The twelfth edition of the South American Championship was held in Buenos Aires, Argentina from 1 to 17 November 1929. The 1928 edition was postponed due to the participation of Chile, Uruguay and Argentina in the 1928 Summer Olympics held in Amsterdam, Netherlands, where Uruguay and Argentina won gold and silver respectively.

The participating countries were Argentina, Paraguay, Peru, and Uruguay, while Brazil, Bolivia, and Chile withdrew from the tournament.

Argentina won its fourth continental title.

Squads
For a complete list of participants squads see: 1929 South American Championship squads

Venues

Final round
Each team plays a single match against each of the other teams. Two points are awarded for a win, one point for a draw and zero points for a defeat.

Result

Goal scorers

5 goals
  Aurelio González

3 goals

  Manuel Ferreira
  Diógenes Domínguez
  Lorenzo Fernández

2 goals

  Mario Evaristo
  Adolfo Zumelzú

1 goal

  Roberto Cherro
  Carlos Peucelle
  Nessi
  Agustín Lizarbe
  Juan Andrade

References

 
1929
1929
1929 in South American football
1929 in Argentine football
1929 in Peruvian football
1929 in Paraguayan football
1929 in Uruguayan football
1929
November 1929 sports events
1929
1920s in Buenos Aires
Sport in Avellaneda